Hasan Emini (born in Kavajë) is a retired Albanian footballer who played as a defender for Besa Kavajë during the 1980s. He coached amateur Polish club Napravia Naprawa.

References

Besa Kavajë players
Footballers from Kavajë
Albanian footballers
Albanian football managers
Association football defenders
Year of birth missing